Rare Shit, Collabos and Freestyles is the 2003 debut compilation album by underground supergroup Army of the Pharaohs. It contains various tracks from members of the group.

Track listing

References

Army of the Pharaohs albums
2003 compilation albums
Hip hop compilation albums
Babygrande Records albums